Chukwudifu Oputa  (22 September 1916 – 4 May 2014) was a Nigerian jurist who was Judge of the Supreme Court of Nigeria from 1984 to 1989. He was appointed in 1999 by Olusegun Obasanjo to head the Oputa panel which investigated human right abuses by former military juntas and submitted their findings in 2003.

Early life and education
Chukwudifu Oputa was born on 22 September 1916 in Oguta to Chief Oputa Uzukwu and Madam  Nwametu Oputa. His father an Igbo chieftain married 10 wives and fathered multiple children of which Chukwudifu was the last.
He started his education at the Sacred Heart School, Oguta from 1930 to 1936 and then proceeded to the Christ the king College, Onitsha for his post primary education from 1937 to 1940 where he obtained his West Africa Senior School Certificate.
Oputa furthered to the Yaba Higher College but had to leave for Achimota College, Ghana during the World War II where he obtained a degree in Economics in 1945. He then moved to London where he graduated with a Bachelor of Arts in History from the University of London and then a degree in Law by 1953. He was called to bar at the Bar-Gary Inn on 26 November 1953.

Law career
Oputa came back to Nigeria where he set up a private law firm and practiced for years, handling multiple high-profile cases including the Oguta Chieftaincy Title dispute in 1959 and the Amayenabo dispute in 1960. He was appointed a justice of the then High Court of Eastern Nigeria in 1966 and promoted to Chief Judge of Imo State in 1976.
Oputa was promoted to Justice of the Supreme Court of Nigeria in 1984 where he served for 5 years before he retired in 1989. His stint at the Supreme court was commended by his fellow justices with former Chief Justice, Mohammed Bello, described him as "the Socrates of the Supreme Court". He was recalled by Olusegun Obasanjo to head The Human Rights Violation Investigation Commission of Nigeria famously referred to as the Oputa panel to investigate human rights during the period of military rule from 1984 to 1999.

Personal life
Oputa was a devoted Catholic and honored Knight Commander of St. Gregory the great and Knight Commander of St. Sylvester pope, Knight of St. Mulumba. He has published over 40 papers in lectures, conferences and seminar. The Oputa Foundation was created in his honor to promote accountable, transparent and respect for the rule of law.. He died on 4 May 2014 due to a minor illness.

References

1924 births
2014 deaths
Chief justices of Nigeria
People from Imo State
Nigerian Roman Catholics
Alumni of the University of London
Yaba College of Technology alumni
Nigerian expatriates in the United Kingdom